Ephialtias dorsispilota is a moth of the  family Notodontidae. It is found from Panama and Costa Rica to Colombia.

Larvae have been recorded on Lindackeria laurina.

External links
Species page at Tree of Life project

Notodontidae of South America
Moths described in 1905